Kelah Rash-e Bala (also Romanized as Kelah Rash-e Bālā; also known as Kalderesh-e ‘Olyā and Kelahrash-e ‘Olyā) is a village in Shepiran Rural District, Kuhsar District, Salmas County, West Azerbaijan Province, Iran. At the 2006 census, its population was 757, in 129 families.

References 

Populated places in Salmas County